Autherley Junction is the name of the canal junction where the Shropshire Union Canal terminates and meets the Staffordshire and Worcestershire Canal near to Oxley, north Wolverhampton, West Midlands, England.

History
The Staffordshire and Worcestershire Canal was opened in 1772. It provided a link between the Trent and Mersey Canal at Great Haywood Junction in the north and the River Severn at Stourport in the south. A significant trade soon developed between the Potteries and the south west.  to the south of the junction site, the canal was joined by the Birmingham Canal Navigations at Aldersley Junction, which provided a route for manufactured goods to pass northwards. In 1835, the Birmingham and Liverpool Junction Canal opened, connecting the Chester Canal at Nantwich to the Staffordshire and Worcestershire at Autherley. It was one of the new generation of canals, which instead of following the contours, used cuttings and embankments to provide a more direct route, and had locks organised into flights where continuing on the level was not possible. Its effect on the Staffordshire and Worcestershire was immediate, with most of the traffic which had previously travelled northwards from Birmingham diverting onto the newer faster route.

The Staffordshire and Worcestershire could now only charge tolls for the short distance between Aldersley and Autherley Junctions, instead of the whole  to Great Haywood, and in order to minimise the loss of income, they raised the tolls for this section to absurd levels. In order to resolve the situation, the Birmingham and Liverpool Junction Canal worked with the Birmingham Canal company  and proposed the Tettenhall and Autherley Canal and Aqueduct. This would have left the Birmingham Canal just above lock 19, crossed the Staffordshire and Worcestershire Canal just below Aldersley Junction by an aqueduct made of iron, and then dropped down through three locks to join the canal above the stop lock. The plans were drawn up by Dugdale Houghton, a firm of surveyors from Birmingham, and a bill was presented to Parliament, but the canal was never constructed, as the Staffordshire and Worcestershire company reduced their tolls rather than lose them altogether. The Birmingham and Liverpool Junction Canal became part of the Shropshire Union Canal network in 1846.

Location
It is also the highest point on the Shropshire Union Canal main line, which descends through 46 locks to Ellesmere Port. A stop lock with a minimal drop of just a few inches was built by the Birmingham and Liverpool Junction Canal just before the junction, to ensure that they did not take large volumes of water from the Staffordshire and Worcestershire to supply their canal. It remains in use, although both canals are now managed by the Canal & River Trust and so theft of water is no longer an issue.

Bibliography

References

See also

List of canal junctions in Great Britain

Canal junctions in England
Staffordshire and Worcestershire Canal
Transport in Wolverhampton
Shropshire Union Canal
Stop locks